Contesti may refer to:

People
 Samuel Contesti, figure skater

Places
 Conțești River
 Conțești, Dâmbovița
 Conțești, Teleorman